Shannon Rosella Phillips  (born September 4, 1975) is a Canadian politician who was elected in the 2015 and 2019 Alberta general elections to represent the electoral district of Lethbridge-West in the 29th and 30th Alberta Legislatures, respectively. She is a member of the Alberta New Democratic Party. On May 24, 2015 she was sworn in as the Minister of Environment and Parks and Minister Responsible for the Status of Women in the Alberta Cabinet. She also served Minister Responsible for Climate Change and as the Deputy Government House Leader. Phillips previously ran in the 2012 general election, losing to PC incumbent Greg Weadick.

Personal life 
Phillips' mother was a physics teacher in Spruce Grove, where Phillips grew up with her parents and younger sister. Phillips graduated from the University of Alberta with a bachelor of political science with honours in 1999 and with a masters of arts in 2002.

Phillips is an economic policy analyst who worked for the Alberta Federation of Labour for five years prior to political life, where she did much work on energy and environment-related matters. She also served as chair of the group Womanspace Lethbridge for five years. Phillips is an activist, a feminist, and is in favour of organized labour. Phillips organized her first protest at age 17, which was successful in fighting Spruce Grove's curfew imposed on teenagers.

Phillips played roller derby for the Deathbridge Derby Dames team as Gnome Stompsky. Her derby number, 4746, reflects the number of votes she received the first time she ran and lost for the Alberta NDP in 2012.  Phillips is conversational in French and is a mother of two.

Political career 
In 2000, Phillips worked on Brian Mason's by-election campaign in Edmonton-Highlands-Norwood. She worked as a communication aide during the early years Ralph Klein was Premier of Alberta.

Advocacy 
Phillips has advocated on numerous issues, such as: Aboriginal land claims, consultation and relations, Climate Change, Human rights, technology industry programs (Artificial Intelligence strategy), renewable energy procurement, support for small and local breweries, public service wages and women's economic equality. Phillips is an advocate for labour relations and bargaining rights. Phillips is an advocate for the Water Act, which protects Water Act license holders to first-in-time, first-in-right system that protects investments in irrigation, a benefit to farmers. Phillips has been advocating for Lethbridge's Supervised injection site (Safe Consumption Site) to expand for safe intox and detox support, as well as supportive housing.

Shannon Phillips and Rachel Notley released a climate change policy plan in 2015, which included Carbon price to be $30 per tonne by 2018, coal-fired power plants to be phased out by 2030, emissions from oil sands to be capped at 100 mega tonnes per year, methane emissions to be reduced by 45% by 2025 in the oil & gas sector, and 30% of all electricity to be renewable generated by 2030. Phillips' first act as Environment Minister was to ensure quality oil sands monitoring and that the chief scientist that is in charge of the report makes it public, and not to the Minister.

Phillips spoke against Bill 1 - The Act to Repeal the Carbon Tax. Phillips spoke and voted against Bill 8, known briefly as "Bill Hate".

Phillips is an ally to the LGBTQ+ community and has spoken for and the protection of LGBTQ+ rights and freedoms, as she has strongly voted against the United Conservative Party Bill 8 - The Education Amendment Act, which would remove protections for LGBTQ+ youth from being outed by school staff or administration whenever a child joins a Gay–straight alliance (GSA). Phillips recalls growing up in a homophobic community where her peer confided in her their fears of being killed if the public were to fight out that they were gay, which greatly influenced Phillip's advocacy for GSAs.

In the news
On June 24, 2016 the Wildrose Party, said during question period that Phillips' editorial work for Greenpeace's Mike Hudema 2004 book, entitled An Action a Day Keeps Global Capitalism Away, would "make the business and industrial sectors even more jittery about the agenda of the new NDP government." Phillips, who wrote the foreword and did some copy editing, said she did not contribute to the content.

On January 8, 2018, Phillips was in the news because of a Tweet, which Phillips said was sent by her assistant, in support of a Green Challenge by Environment Lethbridge, in which the Lethbridge organization called on all Albertans to undertake five actions for 30 days from January 15 through February 15. This included "unplugging electronics, refraining from idling vehicles, using reusable shopping bags, reducing shower time, and going meatless for one day each week." Rich Smith, executive director of Alberta Beef Producers said that Environment Lethbridge's Green Challenge which suggested eating less meat was clearly done with "good intentions" but was misinformed as "going meatless for one day a week" would not "reduce people's environmental impact substantially."

On January 5, 2019, following alleged bullying and intimidation of the proposed Bighorn Wildland Provincial Park supporters, Minister Phillips issued a statement announcing that public consultations that were planned for Drayton Valley, Edmonton, Red Deer, and Sundre, would be cancelled and with announcements of alternative consultations. The proposed region, situated between Banff National Park and Jasper National Park, would provide a vast and critical wildlife corridor for numerous wildlife species, including sensitive species, such as bull trout—Alberta’s provincial fish, wolverine, and grizzly bears, that would extend from Yellowstone National Park in Wyoming in the south to the Yukon in Northern Canada. According to a January 7, 2019 article in The Globe and Mail, some residents of Rocky Mountain House, a town of 7,000, led by United Conservative Party (UCP) Member of the Legislative Assembly of Alberta (MLA) for Rimbey-Rocky Mountain House-Sundre, Jason Nixon, oppose the creation of the park. Nixon has made unfounded claims that the plan is a "foreign-funded plot to wall off the back country to Albertans who call the region home".

In January of 2019, Phillips took heat in the media for misleading Albertan's, alleging the RCMP advised her to cancel public consultations when no such advisement occurred.  • In regards to Phillps remarks, RCMP spokesman Fraser Logan issued a written statement via email, stating: “Alberta RCMP did not provide any official advice to Alberta Environment and Parks regarding the Bighorn public consultations. Logan stated, “We can confirm we have been contacted by some members of the public who wanted the police to be aware of some concerning social media interactions around the Bighorn public consultation,” said the RCMP. “Alberta RCMP can confirm that we do not have any ongoing investigations relating to the consultations.” 

On October 1, 2019, reporter Carrie Tait with The Globe and Mail reported that families of the athletes involved in the Humboldt Broncos bus crash in 2018 are urging the United Conservative Party (UCP) not to ease training standards for semi-truck drivers. According to reporting, Minister Devin Dreeshen and Premier Jason Kenney indicated their support for relaxing those training standards for semi-truck drivers in some sectors including farmers. Ryan Straschnitzki, a player who was paralyzed in the crash, has since praised the new training standards and called for higher standards instead of lower standards, saying "The better the safety, the more lives that can be saved.” Toby Boulet, a leading voice among the parents of the players in the crash for increased training standards, said "I would love to hear Mr Devin Dreeshen's views and the views of any other[s] who are placing the value of a truck full of grain over my son’s life." Phillips sided with the players and their families, saying, "It is unfortunate that Jason Kenney doesn’t care about the perspective of family members of the Humboldt Broncos... There has got to be a way for him to address those safety concerns rather than throwing them out in the name of a red tape fantasy.”

In July 2020, two members of the Lethbridge Police Service were demoted for inappropriately using their police jobs in 2017 to follow and photograph Phillips, then the Minister of Environment and Parks of Alberta. Phillips was in the process of meeting with stakeholders in the lead-up to the formation of Castle Provincial Park, where the two officers had an interest in off-road vehicle driving. One of the officers took photos of the meeting and ran a police check on the stakeholder; the photo was later published on Facebook under a pseudonym alongside criticism of the NDP government. After an investigation by the Medicine Hat Police Service, charges were laid against the two officers, who admitted to the misconduct charges.

Electoral history

2019 general election

2015 general election

2012 general election

Notes

References

1975 births
Alberta New Democratic Party MLAs
Living people
Members of the Executive Council of Alberta
People from Lethbridge
Women MLAs in Alberta
21st-century Canadian politicians
21st-century Canadian women politicians
Women government ministers of Canada
Roller derby skaters